Clanculus simoni is a species of sea snail, a marine gastropod mollusk in the family Trochidae, the top snails.

Description
The size of the shell varies between 9.8 mm and 12.7 mm.

Distribution
This marine species occurs off the Philippines.

References

External links
 

simoni
Gastropods described in 2006